Donnie Preston (16 January 1914 – 12 December 2006) was a South African cricketer. He played in twelve first-class matches from 1933/34 to 1947/48.

References

External links
 

1914 births
2006 deaths
South African cricketers
Border cricketers
Eastern Province cricketers
Cricketers from East London, Eastern Cape